Trần Văn Xuân (born 6 September 1934) is a Vietnamese fencer.  He competed at the 1960 and 1964 Summer Olympics.

References

External links
 

1934 births
Living people
Vietnamese male fencers
Olympic fencers of Vietnam
Fencers at the 1960 Summer Olympics
Fencers at the 1964 Summer Olympics
Sportspeople from Ho Chi Minh City